Teriberka is a rural locality (a selo) in Kolsky District of Murmansk Oblast, Russia, located on the Barents Sea coast, at the mouth of the river Teriberka.

History
As a settlement, Teriberka was first mentioned circa 1523.  Eyewitnesses from that time period confirmed the appearance of permanent Russian settlers.  However, according to other sources, it was founded in the 1860s—the decade when the Murman coast was actively being settled.

By the end of 19th century, it was well-developed: having a church, a lighthouse, and a weather station (the first one on the Murmansk coast).

Names of the geographical features of the area, such as Cape Deploranskogo, Zavalishina Lip, and others relate to the Peter's Great expedition.

In the beginning of the 20th century, Teriberka had well-developed cod and shark fishing businesses (undertaken mostly by the Norwegians who owned a factory and a store). By the end of the 1920s, the first collective farm was organized in the village; it included a dairy farm and a reindeer herd in addition to the fishing boats.

Before World War II, fishermen and dairy farm workers of the collective farm were honored several times for their achievements and were sent to the VDNKh in Moscow. A shipyard construction in the village of Lyudeyny started around the same time.

Teriberka developed quickly after the war.  In the 1940s–1960s, there were two fishing farms, two dairy farms, a poultry farm, a 2000-head reindeer herd, an American mink breeding farm, and two fish processing facilities in the village, as well as shops and warehouses of the White Sea base of Goslov (a government-sponsored organization of skilled workers). Repair facilities of the shipyard were working at their full capacity and were being expanded.  Active construction of housing and public organizations was underway.  The village had a stadium, a community center, workers' clubs of the shipyard, a fish processing facility, a Young Pioneers club, two schools (elementary and secondary), a boarding school for children from the coastal settlements, one inpatient and one outpatient hospital, and an ambulance station.

Teriberka became the administrative center of a district and was growing and developing at a very fast rate.

The downfall began in the 1960s, when the district was transferred to the jurisdiction of the town of Severomorsk.  As ship tonnage increased and fishing fleets were able to travel more easily in the open ocean, the coastal fishing business became less important.  A newly constructed fish processing complex in Murmansk put smaller processing facilities in Teriberka out of business.

During the process of "enlargement", the collective farm "Murmanets" was abolished along with its mink farm.  Goslov's White Sea base fell apart, the reindeer herd was transferred to the village of Lovozero, and the fish processing plant was shut down because large fishing vessels were not able to enter the river from the ocean.

In the 1980s, a school of salmon was destroyed during the construction of the Teriberka River hydroelectric plants. In the 2000s, the village was again subordinated to the district instead of the town of Severomorsk.

Climate

In popular culture 
The 2014 Russian drama movie Leviathan, which won a Golden Globe in 2015, was filmed in Teriberka (also in Kirovsk and Olenegorsk).

Notable people
 Aleksandra Andreevna Antonova (1932–2014), Kildin Sámi teacher, writer, poet, translator

References

Notes

Sources

Rural localities in Murmansk Oblast
Kolsky District
Kolsky Uyezd